Monte Penice is a mountain of Lombardy and Emilia-Romagna in Italy.

References 

Mountains of Lombardy
Mountains of Emilia-Romagna
Mountains of the Apennines
One-thousanders of Italy